Gasa Dzong or Gasa Tashi Tongmön Dzong near Gasa is the administrative center of Gasa Dzongkhag (district) in the northwestern region of Bhutan. The Dzong was built in the 17th century by Tenzin Drukdra the second Druk Desi over the site of a meditation place established by Drubthob Terkungpa in the 13th century. The Dzong was constructed as a bulwark against attacks from the north and named Tashi Tongmön Dzong. It was later expanded by the fourth Desi, Gyalse Tenzin Rabgye.

In January 2008 Gasa Dzong was badly damaged by fire.

Sources

References

External links 
 Gasa Tashi Thongmön Dzong 
 Long buried tunnels unearthed below Gasa Dzong

Dzongs in Bhutan
Populated places in Bhutan